Bernhard Georg Lund (20 February 1889 – 9 January 1968) was a Norwegian yacht racer. He was born in Darmstadt, Germany. and represented the Royal Norwegian Yacht Club. He  competed at the 1928 Summer Olympics in Amsterdam, where he placed fourth in the 8-meter class. He died in Oslo in 1968.

References

External links

1889 births
1968 deaths
Sportspeople from Darmstadt
Sailors at the 1928 Summer Olympics – 8 Metre
Norwegian male sailors (sport)
Olympic sailors of Norway
German emigrants to Norway